The Tangenziale di Bologna, or Bologna ring road (officially known as RA 1), is an Italian motorway serving the urban area Bologna.

It runs parallel to Autostrada A14 from Casalecchio di Reno, west of Bologna, to San Lazzaro di Savena, east of Bologna.

It was projected by engineers Francesco Fantoni and Giorgio Mondini; construction works lasted three years, and the infrastructure was inaugurated on 12 July 1967.

References

Buildings and structures completed in 1967
Autostrade in Italy
Transport in Emilia-Romagna